Frode Scheie (born 19 March 1967) is a Norwegian handball coach and former player. He made his debut on the Norwegian national team in 1995, and played 105 matches for the national team between 1995 and 2002. He participated at the 1999 World Men's Handball Championship where the Norwegian team placed 13th, and he served as captain for Norway at the 2000 European Men's Handball Championship. Scheie has been sports commentator for the television channel TV 2 Norway and for Viasat.

References

External links

1967 births
Living people
Norwegian male handball players
Sports commentators